5th Dragoons or 5th Dragoon Regiment may refer to the following military units:
5th Dragoon Regiment (France), French Army unit
5th Royal Irish Lancers, British Army unit active 1858–1922 or its predecessor the 5th Dragoons active 1751–1799
5th Dragoon Guards, British Army unit active 1788–1922
5th Royal Inniskilling Dragoon Guards, British Army unit active 1922–1993
5th Dragoons (Canada), Canadian Militia unit active 1856 - 1901 when it was amalgamated into the 6th Duke of Connaught's Royal Canadian Hussars.